Peter Rickmers (born 12 November 1979) is a German curler. He was born in Hamburg, and is educated as aerospace engineer. He competed at the 2011 European Curling Championships in Moscow, the 2012 World Curling Championships in Basel, the 2013 European Curling Championships in Stavanger, and at the 2014 Winter Olympics in Sochi.

References

External links

1979 births
Living people
Sportspeople from Hamburg
Curlers at the 2014 Winter Olympics
German male curlers
Olympic curlers of Germany